

1950s

1960s

1970s

See also 
 Information revolution

Notes

References

External links 
 A Brief History of Computing, by Stephen White. A computer history site; the present article is a modified version of his timeline, used with permission.

1950
.
.
.
1950s in technology
1960s in technology
1970s in technology